El Mercurio (known online as El Mercurio On-Line, EMOL) is a Chilean newspaper with editions in Valparaíso and Santiago. Its Santiago edition is considered the country's newspaper of record and it is considered the oldest daily in the Spanish language currently in circulation. El Mercurio is owned by El Mercurio S.A.P. (Sociedad Anónima Periodística 'joint stock news company'), which operates a network of 19 regional dailies and 32 radio stations across the country.

History

The Valparaíso edition of El Mercurio was founded by Pedro Félix Vicuña (Benjamín Vicuña Mackenna's father) on September 12, 1827, and was later acquired by Agustín Edwards Ross in 1880. The Santiago edition was founded by Agustín Edwards Mac Clure, son of Edwards Ross, on June 1, 1900. In 1942 Edwards Mac Clure died and his son Agustín Edwards Budge took over as president. When Edwards Budge died in 1956, his son, Agustín Edwards Eastman, took control of the company. Edwards Eastman died in 2017, leaving the company in hands of his son Cristián Edwards del Río.

El Mercurio SAP owns the Chilean afternoon daily newspaper La Segunda, which published news with sensationalist and confrontational language that was considered inappropriate for El Mercurio.

CIA funding
El Mercurio received funds from the CIA in the early 1970s to undermine the Socialist government of Salvador Allende, acting as a mouthpiece for anti-Allende propaganda.

Declassified documents that detail US interventions in Chile revealed the paper's role, and the extent of the paper’s cooperation with the CIA:

Support reached to the highest levels of the US government. When the paper requested significant funds for covert support in September 1971, “...in a rare example of presidential micromanagement of a covert operation, Nixon personally authorized the $700,000—and more if necessary—in covert funds to El Mercurio.”  (p. 93)

Role in 1973 coup d'état
The paper played "a significant role in setting the stage for the military coup" which took place on 11 September 1973, bringing General Augusto Pinochet to power. It mobilised opponents of President Salvador Allende and the gremialismo movement to be active in destabilisation from the street, while also advocating the neoliberal policies of the yet-to-come Chicago Boys.

1988 to the present
Former journalists of El Mercurio have been crucial in the creation of various new newspapers in Chile including Diario Financiero in 1988, El Líbero in 2014, and Ex-Ante in 2020.

El Mercurio's building in Valparaíso was set on fire by protesters in October 2019 during the 2019 Chilean protests sparked by rise in transportation cost.

See also
 El Mercurio de Valparaíso
 Project FUBELT
 List of newspapers in Chile

References

CIA article "Report of CIA Chilean Task Force Activities, 15 September to 3 November 1970" (November 18, 1970). Report from CIA's 1970 Anti-Allende Task Force (Archive)

External links

El Mercurio de Santiago (printed editions from October 27, 2007 to present): Flash version, Text version
El Mercurio en Internet (online edition)
El Mercurio de Valparaíso

Newspapers published in Chile
Mass media companies of Chile
Spanish-language newspapers
Publications established in 1900
Conservatism in Chile
Mass media in Santiago
1900 establishments in Chile